Bear Valley is an unincorporated community in Northumberland County, Pennsylvania, United States, near Shamokin.  It is the site of an abandoned anthracite strip mine.  This strip mine is a popular place for observing the Llewellyn Formation.

Unincorporated communities in Northumberland County, Pennsylvania
Unincorporated communities in Pennsylvania